

Cyneheard was a medieval Bishop of Winchester.

Cyneheard was consecrated in 756. He died between 759 and 778.

Citations

References

External links
 

Bishops of Winchester
8th-century English bishops
8th-century deaths
Year of birth unknown
Year of death uncertain